There are 24 public libraries in Manchester, England, including the famous Central Library in St Peter’s Square. 

The oldest community library still in use is Levenshulme Library in South Manchester, built in 1903. Levenshulme Library is also a Carnegie library, having been built with money donated by Scottish-American businessman and philanthropist Andrew Carnegie, who funded the building of over 2,500 libraries across the world. Two new multimillion-pound libraries have recently opened in North Manchester as part of a major regeneration scheme, including the eco-designed North City Library in Harpurhey. and The Avenue Library and Learning Centre in Higher Blackley.

History

There has been a public library service in Manchester since 1852, when the Manchester Free Library opened in the Hall of Science, Campfield, on the site of what is now the Museum of Science and Industry. Famous figures such as Charles Dickens and William Thackeray attended and spoke at its inauguration. Manchester had taken advantage of powers granted by the Public Libraries and Museums Act of 1850 to become the first local authority to establish a rate-supported public lending and reference library. Andrea Crestadoro, Chief Librarian of the city 1864–1879, is credited with being the first person to propose that books could be catalogued by using keywords that did not occur in the title of the book.

In 1915 the libraries consisted of a reference library, 24 lending libraries, a foreign library, the Henry Watson Music Library and the Thomas Greenwood Library for Librarians. The number of volumes altogether exceeded half a million and the stock of the lending libraries was arranged according to the Dewey Decimal Classification. The library was housed in temporary buildings in Piccadilly on the site of the former Manchester Royal Infirmary. The Moss Side library contained special collections on Thomas de Quincey, Mrs. Gaskell and the Brontës and the foreign library was temporarily housed at the Cheetham branch. The Henry Watson Music Library contained 30,000 volumes and hundreds of thousands of pieces of music; the Thomas Greenwood Library for Librarians contained about 15,000 volumes. After the vacation of the first town hall in King Street the building was reused for the public lending library.

Branch libraries
These include libraries in Chorlton-cum-Hardy, Hulme, Withington and Didsbury. The Withington Library (1927), on Wilmslow Road, was designed by Henry Price.

In 1971 there were 20 branch libraries and services were provided by four mobile libraries or by caravans to a further 19 areas.

Central Library building project, 2010–13
The Central Library is closed from 2010 to 2013 for major refurbishment and expansion. During the closure its books are stored in a disused part of the Winsford salt mine. Some of its services will be available at a temporary location nearby. A new community library for the city centre on Deansgate has been provided. The community library occupies Elliott House (between Lloyd Street and Jackson's Row).

Chief Librarians
Edward Edwards, 1850–1858
Robert Wilson Smiles, 1858–1864 
Andrea Crestadoro, 1864–1879
Charles W. Sutton, 1879–1920 
L. Stanley Jast, 1920–1931 
Charles Nowell 1932–1954 
D. I. Colley, 1955–1974
Kenneth W King 1975 -

Director of Libraries
David Owen, 1980-1998
Paul Catcheside, 1998-2000
Lis Phelan, 2000-2003
Vicky Rosin MBE, 2003-2005

Head of Libraries 
Nicky Parker, 2005-2009
Neil MacInnes OBE, 2010-2015

Head of Libraries, Galleries and Culture
Neil MacInnes OBE, 2015-

Other librarians
Ernest Axon
George Lovell
K. W. King

References

Further reading
Axon, William (1877) Handbook of the Public Libraries of Manchester and Salford. Manchester: Abel Heywood and Son; pp. 83–88, 99–112 (chapters: xiii: The Corporation Library at the Town Hall.--xvi-xvii: The Free Reference Library.--xviii: The Free Lending Libraries.)
Credland, W. R. (1899) The Manchester Public Free Libraries: a history and description and guide to their contents and use. Manchester: Libraries Committee
Jast, L. Stanley (1929) "The Manchester Public Libraries", in: The Book of Manchester and Salford. Manchester: George Falkner and Sons; pp. 169–75

External links
 Manchester Library & Information Service on the Manchester City Council website

Culture in Manchester
Education in Manchester
Libraries in Manchester